Anthony Scardino Jr. (born August 24, 1936) is an American Democratic Party politician and government official from New Jersey. He served in the New Jersey Senate from the 36th district from 1974 to 1980 and had served as Mayor of Lyndhurst, New Jersey.

Born in Hoboken in 1936, he attended public schools in Lyndhurst and served in the United States Air Force. He served on the Lyndhurst Board of Education from 1963 to 1972 and was Mayor of Lyndhurst at the time of his election to the Senate.

He was an unsuccessful candidate to the New Jersey General Assembly in 1971 running in District 13-A. However, two years later he was elected to the State Senate from the new 36th District encompassing southern Bergen County. He was subsequently reelected in 1977. During his second term in the Senate, he resigned to take a position on the Hackensack Meadowlands Development Commission, later known as the New Jersey Meadowlands Commission. He served as the agency's executive director for 18 years. Following that agency's merger with the New Jersey Sports and Exposition Authority, he became a commissioner there. Scardino has also served on the Felician College Board of Trustees and the board of the Hackensack University Medical Center.

He is married to the former Madelyn Giammetta and has five children.

References

1936 births
Living people
United States Air Force airmen
People from Hoboken, New Jersey
People from Lyndhurst, New Jersey
Democratic Party New Jersey state senators
Mayors of places in New Jersey